Lippincott is an American brand strategy and design company. Based in New York, it is part of the Oliver Wyman Group, a business unit of Marsh & McLennan Companies.

History
Lippincott was founded in 1943 as Dohner & Lippincott by Donald R. Dohner and J. Gordon Lippincott, who taught together at Pratt Institute in Brooklyn, NY. After Dohner's sudden death in December of that year, the name was changed to J. Gordon Lippincott & Associates. In the late 1940s, Lippincott joined forces with Walter P. Margulies, and the firm was renamed Lippincott & Margulies.

Works
The company's early design work included the Campbell Soup Company's red-and-white can, the FTD Mercury logo, the Betty Crocker spoon, the G on General Mills products, and adaptations of the Coca-Cola logo. In 1947, automobile designer Preston Tucker hired J. Gordon Lippincott & Associates to replace automotive designer Alex Tremulis in the body development of the 1948 Tucker Sedan. The Lippincott team designed a new front end and modified the rear end of the car to match the side panels and roof previously developed by Tremulis.

By the early 1960s, Lippincott & Margulies had moved into emphasizing marketing and corporate image. It was J. Gordon Lippincott who first coined the term "corporate identity", and the firm pioneered the linking of name, logo, advertising and packaging into an integrated and uniform marketing tool. Lippincott & Margulies designed many of the world's most familiar corporate logos, including those of S.C. Johnson, Chrysler, Eastern Air Lines, Del Monte, RCA, MGM, American Express, Amtrak, Pizza Hut, Red Lobster, Baskin Robbins, Infiniti, and Nokia.

Acquisition
Lippincott & Margulies was acquired in 1986 by Marsh & McLennan, an insurance conglomerate expanding its focus into management consulting. Lippincott & Margulies soon began working with another Marsh & McLennan property, Mercer Management Consulting; both shared some of the same corporate clients. In January 2003, Lippincott & Margulies was merged into Mercer as a division called Lippincott Mercer; this combined name was used until 2007, when the unit became known as simply Lippincott.

References

External links

OLT Consulting Site
Reputation Management

Design companies established in 1943
American companies established in 1943
1943 establishments in New York City
Brand valuation
International management consulting firms
Branding companies of the United States
Companies based in New York City